VCU/VUU Station, located at the corner of Broad and Shafer near the campuses of Virginia Commonwealth University and Virginia Union University, is a Richmond, Virginia bus station site of the GRTC Bus Rapid Transit route.

Station layout

History 
The station was originally going to be named the Shafer station, but was renamed to VCU-VUU in 2018.

References

External links
 VCU–VUU station

Buildings and structures in Richmond, Virginia
GRTC Pulse stations
2018 establishments in Virginia
Bus stations in Virginia
Transport infrastructure completed in 2018